Sublette Mountain is a mountain summit in Lincoln County, Wyoming,  in elevation. It is the tallest peak of the Sublette Range, which are part of the Southern Wyoming Overthrust Belt. Sublette Mountain is near the Bear Lake County, Idaho, border.

References

Mountains of Wyoming
Mountains of Lincoln County, Wyoming